Leonardo Rosa da Silva, best known as Léo Rosa (13 December 1983 – 9 March 2021) was a Brazilian actor.  He was most known for his role Miguel Campobello in the telenovela Vidas Opostas. Rosa died on 9 March 2021 from testicular cancer.

References

1983 births
2021 deaths
Brazilian male telenovela actors
Deaths from cancer in Rio de Janeiro (state)
Deaths from testicular cancer